Kagawa Station is the name of two train stations in Japan:

 Kagawa Station (Kanagawa) (香川駅)
 Kagawa Station (Yamaguchi) (嘉川駅)